Greenfield is a former civil township of Wayne County, Michigan; it was created from a portion of neighboring Springwells Township in 1833. Greenfield eventually encompassed the survey township T1S R11E.  It even had its own police force. 
By 1875, a series of annexations to Detroit and Highland Park had begun; by 1926, the township of Greenfield had ceased to exist.

Today, Greenfield Road follows the former western township boundary between Greenfield and Redford Township.  8 Mile road was the northern boundary of Greenfield Township.  Tireman Avenue follows the former southern boundary between Greenfield and Springwells Township.

Settlements of the former Greenfield Township 
Cassandra
Greenfield
Howlett
Sherwood
Strathmoor
Whitewood (later Highland Park)
Yew

Noteworthy 
In 1863, American industrialist Henry Ford was born in southern Greenfield Township; Ford's future wife, Clara Jane Bryant, was born four miles to the north, in 1866. The Bryant home stood at the intersection of Greenfield Road and Grand River Avenue.

References

External links 
Nonextant Communities and Townships of Michigan

Defunct townships in Michigan
Former townships in Wayne County, Michigan
1833 establishments in Michigan Territory
Populated places established in 1833
1926 disestablishments in Michigan
Populated places disestablished in 1926